Walter Schmidt (21 December 1891 in Neuemühle, Herscheid; 28 February 1981 in Dortmund) was the fourth Chief Apostle of the New Apostolic Church.

Life 
He was born on 21 December 1891 in Neuemühle. After the death of Chief Apostle Johann Gottfried Bischoff, he was elected as Chief Apostle by an international apostles' meeting. The New Apostolic Church was in a crisis after the death of Bischoff. The Botschaft of Bischoff was not fulfilled; he died on 7 July 1960. He had told that Jesus will come back, at his lifetime. In the service on 10 July 1960, Walter Schmidt was introduced as the new Chief Apostle and, during that service, the admonition to the members was to answer external critics with silence regarding the Bischoff Prophecy.

He retired on 15 February 1975 and died on 28 February 1981 in Dortmund.

Ministries 
 in November 1923: Sub-deacon
 1925: Priest helper
 10. March 1929: Priest
 21. January 1940: District Evangelist
 25. June 1944: District Elder for the district Dortmund
 26. May 1945: Bishop
 29. September 1946: Apostle in the Apostle district Westphalia
 19. September 1948: District Apostle for Westphalia
 10 July 1960: Chief Apostle

References

External links 
 Entry at Apostolische Geschichte.de

1891 births
1981 deaths
Members of the New Apostolic Church
German Christian clergy
People from Rheinisch-Bergischer Kreis